"Mamacita" a song by American R&B group Public Announcement. It was released as the first single from their third studio album Don't Hold Back (2000). It became Public Announcement last top 40 charting song on the US Hot 100 chart where it peaked at No. 39. The song gives a shout out to singer-songwriter R. Kellys hit song Bump N' Grind from the album 12 Play.

Music video
The video is directed by Public Announcement and is one of the last music videos by the group.

Formats and track listings
Digital download
"Mamacita" – 3:47

Credits and personnel
Credits adapted from AllMusic.

 Public Announcement – Primary Artist
 Gromyko Collins, Travon Potts– Composer, Vocals
 Ace – Vocals

Charts

Weekly charts

Year-end charts

References

2000 singles
2000 songs
Epic Records singles